John Giffen Weinmann (August 29, 1928 – June 9, 2016) served as United States Ambassador to Finland and later as the Chief of Protocol of the United States under President George H. W. Bush. He was appointed Ambassador to Finland on October 10, 1989 and presented his credentials on November 10 of that year. His tenure in Finland concluded on August 29, 1991 after being nominated to be Chief of Protocol on July 11, 1991. He succeeded Rockwell A. Schnabel and was succeeded by John Hubert Kelly.

He served as Chief of Protocol from October 31, 1991 to January 20, 1993, succeeding Joseph Verner Reed, Jr. and being succeeded by Molly M. Raiser.

He attended Tulane University.

References

1928 births
2016 deaths
Chiefs of Protocol of the United States
Ambassadors of the United States to Finland